Kim Hammer is a Missionary Baptist preacher and state legislator in Arkansas. He serves in the Arkansas Senate. He is a Republican. He hosts a weekly conservative talk radio show.

Hammer was a member of the Arkansas House of Representatives for eight years before being elected to the state Senate in 2018. He lives in Benton, Arkansas.

In 2020, during the COVID-19 pandemic in Arkansas, Hammer was one of several Republican state legislators who sued Arkansas Governor Asa Hutchinson, a fellow Republican, over public health measures that he ordered to prevent the spread of the virus. An Arkansas judge dismissed the suit.

In 2021, Hammer promoted Donald Trump's claim that the 2020 presidential election was "stolen"; after Trump was impeached for a second time, wrote in a Facebook post that Democrats were "enemies" and called for "political war" to be waged against them. Hammer deleted the post after it garnered criticism. In 2021, as part of Republican efforts to restrict voting following Trump's defeat, Hammer introduced a bill to eliminate early voting in Arkansas on the last Monday before Election Day, a measure that voting-rights groups described as voter suppression. The bill passed the Senate on a 19–13 vote, but failed in the state House on a 43–39 vote.

In 2021, Hammer opposed the grant of a liquor-sales permit for a new Costco Wholesale in west Little Rock, a portion of which is in his district. Hammer wrote a letter to the director of the Alcohol Beverage Control Division, contending that the public's needs were "being adequately met by these existing businesses." By contrast, Little Rock's mayor and vice mayor supported Costco's permit request. The director initially denied Costco's permit application, but this decision was reversed after a successful appeal by Costco to the Control Board directors.

References

Year of birth missing (living people)
Living people
Republican Party Arkansas state senators